Egyptian Media Production City (EMPC) is an information and media complex located near Cairo in Egypt.it covers an area of about 35 million square meters (more than 600 feddans).

History
Construction of the project began in 1992. Phase I was completed in the same year. Then President Hosni Mubarak laid the foundation stone for EMPC Phase II on 29 May 1994.

Phase II was inaugurated by President Mubarak in June 1996. The EMPC was launched in 2000. Its components are as follows:
The Pharaonic city: (Tel El Amarna), which simulates the ancient capital of Egyptian Pharaoh Akhenaten. Architectural designs, drawings, specifications and construction were completed under the supervision of archaeologist. The city comprises about 40 simulated statues of Akhenaten and Nefertiti.
The Islamic Village: is built over an area of 60,000 m2. The architectural style of the village buildings belongs mainly to the Fatimid and Memluke periods, in addition to other styles. The village was designed by specialists in Islamic Architecture.
Magic Land (Children's village), covers an area of 15,000 m2, within the Integrated Activity Area. A 230 m. long entrance gate (Egypt's Gate) was built showing models of most renowned tourist attractions and monuments of Egypt, such as Pharaonic temples, Bibliotica of Alexandria, Giza Pyramids, citadels and fortresses, Saladin's Citadel etc..... This area also contains the Magic Land, and the Dino Jungle, with life-size models of pre-historic monsters such as electronically animated dinosaurs, moving amidst audio-visual effects, as well as the ancient ape-man and birds.
Underwater film shooting area.
The Dolphin area contains a pool, where dolphin and water ballet shows are performed as well as an amphitheatre to accommodate 1.300 spectators.
Included also is an air-conditioned, multi-purpose indoor shooting facility, the largest in the world. Built on an area of 5,000 square metres, to shoot children programmes, the facility comprises a mini-theatre beside children's games including 105 individual-player and 14 collective games. The facilities are sub-divided into Western European, oriental-style areas, as well as children's competition areas and public places for outdoor shooting.
An open theatre, the largest of its kind, is built in a legendary style with open-air halls, and covered terraces, with a new architectural design. The theatre accommodates 1,000 spectators, in addition to theatre boxes (Bargnoires) for 40 spectators.
The area also houses "Ali Baba's cave", where the mythical story is shown via computer-animated puppets.
There is also the traffic city for children and young men. It is a shooting area, with stores, coffeeshops, and gas stations.
The Suzanne Mubarak Data Centre houses all information and data on MPC. It contains an electronic library, computers, various world encyclopedias and connections with the Internet.
The contract for constructing and equipping the Mubarak International Studio Complex at the MPC was signed in January 1997. The complex comprises 114 cinematographic, television and video shooting studios, where state-of-the-art technology is to be used. The project is expected to be completed within three years, at a total cost of 340 million US dollar, including costs of infrastructure, construction, equipment and appliances.

According to studies already conducted, a holding company is to be set up to run MPC, with three subsidiaries, one for production, another for services and maintenance and a third for tourism. The company has an authorised capital of LE 2 billion, and a paid-up capital of LE 1.5 billion. Forty per cent of the company's paid-up capital is subscribed by the Radio and Television Union and ten % by banks, while 20-25%, amounting to LE 400 million will be floated for public subscription.

Project goals
Provide television production of a competitive nature.
Achieve 3,500 hours of indoor studio production 5,000 hours of programmes and outdoor production.
Provide miscellaneous production including drama, cultural, educational features, children programmes to meet local and foreign market requirements.
Provide film production, with a basic capacity of 100 long films per year.
Provide woods and metal works at the services complex.
Use the MPC as a tourist attraction for interested citizens and tourists alike.
Utilize on an economic basis, training centre surplus production on both domestic and external levels.
Use the MPC surplus hotel capacity for providing accommodation services to visitors and tourists calling at the 6th of October City, as well as artists, agents and other members of the public, dealing with MPC.

The sets and buildings
Studios Complex: comprises 14 high technological studios of various sizes, together with annexes and utilities.
Open-air shooting areas ranging from 600 m2 to 2,500 m2 each, equipped with film shooting and tourist services.
Covered Theatre Hall: the 2500-seat hall serves television production of dramatic performances and concerts. It can be also used as an auditorium for conferences and festivals as well as for the 6th of October city community purposes.
Open-air Theatres: serve summer variety / musical / show performances and lyric concerts for television production purposes. The grand theatre accommodates 1,500 persons and the mini-theatre accommodates 1000 children.
Services Complex: Provides fabricating and processing works for the Studios Complex and outdoor shooting areas.
Film Laboratory: Provides film processing services for 16 mm and 35 mm films. Colour correction, editing (montage), final sound recording and dubbing and final version printing are also provided. The laboratory production capacity is estimated at 100 film per year, apart from short materials.
Hotel: contains 250 rooms, in addition to all other amenities, offering a high-quality, 4-star hotel service.
Training centre: contains all facilities necessary to train 3,000 persons per year. The centre provides training to staff members of the Radio and Television Union, in various fields of specialization.
Staff Club: Provides social and sporting activities to the project staff as well as staff members of the Radio and Television Union.

See also 
Dubai Media City
IMPZ
Creative City
Jordan Media City

References

External links 
 

Mass media companies of Egypt
2000 establishments in Egypt
Buildings and structures in Egypt
Mass media in Cairo
Government-owned companies of Egypt
Egyptian companies established in 2000
Mass media companies established in 2000